The European Forum Alpbach (EFA) is an Austrian nonprofit organisation and foundation based in Vienna, Austria. It is best known for hosting the event of the same name in the village of Alpbach. It is an interdisciplinary platform for science, politics, business and culture with its mission cited as "connecting international decision-makers from all sectors of society with an interested audience and committed young people".

History
The forum was founded in 1945 as "International College Weeks" by Otto Molden, who had been active in the Austrian resistance movement, and Simon Moser. Nowadays, more than 4,000 people from over 70 countries accept the invitation to participate in the European Forum Alpbach each year. Participation is open to all interested parties. The events are held in the small village of Alpbach.

Event Programme
The event in August is divided into several main parts. As of 2022 the programme is centred around the following four thematic tracks:

 The Climate Opportunity  
 Securing Europe's Future in a Globalised World  
 The Financing of Europe’s Future  
 The Future of Democracy and the Rule of Law in Europe

The programme structure introduced in 2022 consists of two weeks: the Conference Week and the Lab Week. The Alpbach Seminars (formerly called Seminar Week) constitutes the core programme for scholarship holders and takes place during the whole event. Alpbach in Motion is a three-days summit, being held also within the framework of the European Forum Alpbach. The event offers different formats – from seminars to workshop, hikes, discussion etc.

Accompanying the programme of the European Forum Alpbach throughout is a comprehensive schedule of arts and culture. In exhibitions, concerts and lectures, young artists in particular are offered the opportunity to present their work to the public. There are also the spontaneously organised fireside chats in which sensitive issues can be openly discussed with well-known personalities.

In past years, the programme also included other formats like symposia, a seminar week, Alpbach summer school courses or an Alpbach media academy.

Presidents
 Otto Molden, 1945–1960, 1970–1992
 Heinrich Pfusterschmid-Hardtenstein, 1992–2000 
 Erhard Busek, 2000–2012
 Franz Fischler, 2012–2020
 Andreas Treichl, 2020–

Networks

Forum Alpbach Network (FAN) - Initiative groups and clubs

Former scholarship holders of the European Forum Alpbach founded initiative groups and clubs in more than 30 countries around the world (mostly in Central and Eastern Europe) in order to work together for the constant advancement of the forum. These groups and clubs promote the spirit of Alpbach in their home countries and universities and organise interdisciplinary events and lectures. They are considered to be sister organisations of the forum and most of them are giving out annual scholarships for students to attend the European Forum Alpbach.

Among others, there are initiative groups in Armenia (Yerevan), Albania (Tirana), Austria (Graz, Linz and Vienna), Belgium (Brussels), Bosnia-Herzegovina (Sarajevo), Bulgaria (Sofia), France (Paris), Germany (Berlin and Cologne), Hungary (Budapest), Kosovo (Pristina), Macedonia (Skopje), Moldova (Chişinău), Montenegro (Podgorica), Poland (Warsaw), Serbia (Belgrade), Romania (Bucharest) and Ukraine (Kyiv, Lviv). Clubs exist in Austria (Burgenland, Lower Austria, Salzburg, Styria, Tyrol, Upper Austria, Vienna and Vorarlberg), Austria (Klagenfurt) / Italy / Slovenia (Senza Confini), Bulgaria, Croatia (Zagreb), Czech Republic, Greece, Italy (South Tyrol and Trentino), Liechtenstein, Middle East, Russia (Moscow), Serbia (Belgrade) and UK (London).

African Alpbach Network (AAN) 
The African Alpbach Network was founded in 2019 and consists of more than 70 members from more than ten African countries.

Alpbach in Motion Alumni Club 
Alpbach in Motion (AIM) is a three-day summit taking place during the European Forum Alpbach. The AIM programme connects up to 40 emerging leaders from various business backgrounds. It aims to encourage its participants to strengthen Europe by bringing change and new ways of acting into their industries and networks. Former participants of the programme founded an alumni club that exchanges and organises events on a regular basis.

Past speakers

| width="25%" align="left" valign="top" style="border:0"|
 Theodor W. Adorno
 Martti Ahtisaari
 Hans Albert
 Catherine Ashton
 Mark Bedau
 Ernst Bloch
 James M. Buchanan
 Ernst B. Chain
 Christo
 Ralf Dahrendorf
 Jamie Davies
 Jacques Delors
 Renato Dulbecco
 Friedrich Dürrenmatt
 John Carew Eccles
| width="25%" align="left" valign="top" style="border:0"|
 Manfred Eigen
 Gottfried von Einem
 Amitai Etzioni
 Paul Feyerabend
 Indira Gandhi
 Theodor Geiger
 Neil Gershenfeld
 Alexander Halavais
 Friedrich von Hayek
 Werner Heisenberg
 Max Horkheimer
 Hans Kelsen
 Ban Ki-Moon
 Václav Klaus
 Helmut Kohl
| width="25%" align="left" valign="top" style="border:0"|
 Franz König
 Imre Lakatos
 Pascal Lamy
 Konrad Lorenz
 Fritz Machlup
 Herbert Marcuse
 Thomas Metzinger
 Jeff Moss
 Kumi Naidoo 
 Viktor Orbán
 Zhong-Ren Peng
 Karl Popper
 Yitzhak Rabin
 Iveta Radičová
 Martin Rees
 José Ramos-Horta
| width="25%" align="left" valign="top" style="border:0"|
 Mary Robinson
 Jeffrey Sachs
 Saskia Sassen
 Myron Scholes
 Erwin Schrödinger
 Richard Sennett
 Shi Yongxin
 Peter Sloterdijk
 Roger Y. Tsien
 Vaira Vike-Freiberga
 Ernst Florian Winter
 Fritz Wotruba
 Joseph Stiglitz
 Mairead McGuinness
 Justin Vivian Bond

References

External links

 European Forum Alpbach Homepage
 Forum Alpbach Network Homepage

1945 establishments in Austria
Political and economic think tanks based in Europe
Organizations established in 1945
Organisations based in Vienna
Think tanks based in Austria